William LeGate (born September 3, 1994) is an American entrepreneur, Thiel Fellow, computer programmer and activist.

A self-taught programmer from the age of 12, LeGate was brought to the public's attention three years later when The New York Times recommended one of the iOS applications he had programmed during middle school.

Upon graduating high school, billionaire PayPal co-founder and investor Peter Thiel awarded LeGate—then aged 18—with a Thiel Fellowship, a US$100,000 grant, given annually to around 20 people under 20 years of age on the condition that they drop out of school in order to pursue an entrepreneurial path. The apps that he made had been downloaded over 7 million times as of April 2017.

Early life
LeGate was born on September 3, 1994, in Atlanta, Georgia, son of a real estate entrepreneur father and stay-at-home mother. He was raised in the suburbs of Atlanta and is a graduate of The Walker School in Marietta, Georgia.

Career

Thiel Fellowship

Having taught himself computer programming from online courses at Stanford, starting at the age of 13, LeGate stated in a 2011 interview that he had always had a passion for entrepreneurship. Throughout high school, he created over a dozen iPhone applications which were being used by 1 in 12 American teenagers upon his graduation.

His early success caught the attention of billionaire PayPal co-founder and investor Peter Thiel who awarded LeGate—then aged 18—with a Thiel Fellowship—a $100,000 (USD) grant given annually to around 20 people under 20 years of age on the condition that they drop out of school in order to pursue an entrepreneurial path.

Imagination Research Labs

At age 14, LeGate created an iOS app development company called Imagination Research Labs, after teaching himself how to code in Objective C.

Ponder

Toward the end of his Thiel Fellowship, LeGate began creating the Ponder mobile application, of which he was listed as co-founder and CEO. The New York Post dubbed Ponder the "anti-Kardashian" photo sharing app, with Teen Vogue adding that Ponder is "drama-free. No trolls, bullying, or negativity. Just cool photos & videos."

Tinder co-founders Sean Rad and Justin Mateen both invested in the app, and Justin's brother Tyler Mateen was a co-founder of Ponder.

GoodPillow

In February 2021, American anti-gun violence activist David Hogg announced that he and LeGate would start GoodPillow to compete with MyPillow, whose CEO Mike Lindell had spread unsubstantiated claims of voter fraud as a staunch supporter of former President Trump. GoodPillow originally started out as a Twitter joke by LeGate. In April 2021, Hogg announced that he had left the company to focus on his education.

In June 2021 the company tweeted that "the first Good Pillow has arrived from the factory."  The company committed themselves to progressive causes, promising to have their pillows made in Texas by workers earning a living wage.

In April 2022, news leaked that GoodPillow and Pillow-Fight had agreed to a merger.

Activism
LeGate, who says he is politically independent, has been an active member on Twitter, where during the presidency of Donald Trump he was part of the anti-Trump online "resistance".  He built much of his following on Twitter by obtaining the top reply under Trump's tweets by replying within minutes of them being posted. He used his platform for activism by questioning the president's policies, pointing out inaccuracies in his tweets, and threading antagonistic tweets. "Honestly, it’s just using Trump's strategy against him," LeGate told BuzzFeed News. "I studied the strategies Trump uses."

Awards and recognition
 In 2014, Business Insider named LeGate, alongside Marques Brownlee, as the most powerful 20-year-old in tech.
 In 2013, LeGate was listed as one of The 25 Most Impressive Kids Graduating From High School This Year, and soon after as one of The 8 Hottest Teenage Startup Founders In The World Right Now. 
 Billionaire PayPal founder and early Facebook investor Peter Thiel granted LeGate a Thiel Fellowship in 2013.
 The Atlanta Business Chronicle listed LeGate as one of their "20 Under 20" youth leaders.
 The New York Times recommended one of LeGate's apps when he was a freshman in high school.

References

External links

 

Living people
1994 births
Businesspeople in computing
American chief executives
Chief technology officers
American technology company founders
American computer businesspeople
American mass media owners
Businesspeople in information technology
Thiel fellows
American activists